Death Rage (Italian: Con la rabbia agli occhi) is a 1976 Italian film directed by Antonio Margheriti and starring Yul Brynner in his final film.

Plot summary 
A chance for revenge brings a hit man out of retirement in this noir  directed by genre specialist Antonio Margheriti (aka Anthony M. Dawson).

Sal Leonardi is a well-connected American Mafioso who, while vacationing in Naples, visits a racetrack and is persuaded by good natured tout Angelo (Massimo Raniei) to put his money on a long shot. While Angelo sometimes works around the odds at the track by putting front-running horses off their stride with a pellet gun, in this case Angelo's horse wins without outside interference and pays off big. But after Sal collects his winnings, he's spotted by Gennare Gallo (Giancarlo Sbragia), a local mob boss who holds a grudge against Sal's partners; guns are drawn, Sal and his bodyguards are killed, while Angelo, who is also a police informant, is stripped of his winnings.

Back in New York, Leonardi's partners are eager to even the score against Gallo, and they approach Peter Marciani (Yul Brynner), a former hired killer who retired after the traumatic murder of his brother. Peter is persuaded to assassinate Gallo when he learns that the Italian mobster was behind the murder of his brother; Peter flies to Naples and finds an ally in Angelo, but he soon learns that there's more to this story than he's been led to believe.

Cast 
Yul Brynner as Peter Marciani
Barbara Bouchet as Anny
Martin Balsam as Commissario
Massimo Ranieri as Angelo
Giancarlo Sbragia as Gennaro Gallo
Sal Borgese as Vincent
Giacomo Furia as Brigadiere Cannavale
Loris Bazzocchi as Pasquale
Rosario Borelli as Gallo's henchman
Luigi Bonos as Peppiniello
Renzo Marignano as Doctor
Tommaso Palladino as Gallo's henchman

Production
Antonio Margheriti's two films Death Rage and The Rip-Off were both starring vehicles for big name foreign actors, but while the latter is set in the United States and features a largely English-speaking cast, Death Rage is set in Naples. The film was shot at Incir-De Paolis in Rome and on location in Naples. The action scenes in the film were shot by assistant director Ignazio Dolce.

According to Margheriti's friend Giacomo Furia, the character actor playing the Commissioner's assistant in the film also co-scripted it. The original story from the film came from director Silvio Siano. The script was written quickly after Margheriti managed to cast Yul Brynner as the lead. As with other Italian genres film, it borrows from other popular films of the era, in this case The Mechanic.

According to Barbara Bouchet, she and Brynner did not get along on the set; he also treated the crew rudely. The film was Brynner's last screen role before he devoted himself to the stage. Brynner and Margheriti planned on making another film about Africa game hunters during World War I, but the film never entered production.

Release
Death Rage was distributed in Italy by Euro International Films. It was released on 22 October 1976 where it grossed a total of 630,234,524 Italian lire on its theatrical release. The film was released in the United Kingdom under the title Anger in His Eyes.

Home video releases of the film in the 1980s remove the opening scene which is only available in its complete form on an Italian DVD.A blu-ray was released by Dark Force Entertainment in February 2020.

Reception
In a contemporary review, the Monthly Film Bulletin stated that the film was "short on plausibility" and "long on picturesque scene-setting and rhetorical optical effects." The review found the film's plot to be "no subsittute for suspense or cogent plotting."

From retrospective reviews, AllMovie stated that the film "isn't afraid to play broad, and as a consequence it frequently feels more silly than suspenseful" and that "Margheriti has the good sense to keep the story moving forward at all times no matter what, and for all its faults it's an entertaining bit of European crime fare."

Notes

Bibliography

External links 
 
 Death Rage at Variety Distribution
 

1976 films
1970s crime thriller films
1970s Italian-language films
Films directed by Antonio Margheriti
Poliziotteschi films
Films scored by Guido & Maurizio De Angelis
Films set in Naples
Films about contract killing
1970s Italian films